is a Japanese manga series written and illustrated by Haruko Ichikawa. It is published by Kodansha in Monthly Afternoon magazine since October 2012, with its chapters collected in twelve tankōbon volumes as of November 2022. Set in a world inhabited by "jewel people", it chronicles their efforts to find the place where they belong and defend their way of life. A 3D anime television series adaptation by Orange aired between October and December 2017.

Synopsis
Land of the Lustrous is set in a far, distant future where the Earth had been struck six times by meteorites, ravaging it in the process. All of the remaining land was reduced to a single coast, whereas nearly all life was destroyed. Over vast stretches of time, a new race of sentient lifeforms emerged; immortal jewels that take the form of people. Phosphophyllite (Phos) is weak (with one of the lowest hardnesses) and considered useless by their peers. Phos asks their aloof but wise colleague Cinnabar for help after they receive an assignment to create a natural history encyclopedia, thus beginning their friendship and personal growth. Meanwhile, the "jewel people" are at war with the Lunarians (Moon people) who want to take advantage of their luxury value.

Characters

Jewels

Known as "Phos" for short. One of the weaker jewel people, with a hardness of 3.5. Declared as too weak for battle, Phos is tasked with creating an encyclopedia logging new information. Despite this, as well as their immaturity and clumsiness, Phosphophyllite desires to enter the battlefield in order to be acknowledged by their peers and prove their worth. As Phos keeps experiencing hardships in battle, their limbs, along with their memories, are gradually lost and replaced with other minerals. At the same time, their personality begins to change gradually with each replacement, as well as their perspective changing.

 
An aloof jewel person who is even weaker than Phos, with a hardness of 2, but carries a powerful poison in their body. Because this poison taints the environment and erases memories stored inside affected jewel shards, Cinnabar is kept on night watch, but yearns to escape the night.

A kind-hearted jewel person who has the maximum hardness of 10, but is still fragile against enemy attacks. 

 
An intimidating diamond-class jewel person who is powerful in combat and is the most durable of the jewels. They are also very protective of Diamond. 

A haughty jewel person who is very confident in their fighting capabilities. Goshenite's partner.

A sweet and responsible jewel person. Morganite's partner.

The medic jewel person in charge of fixing the other jewels when they're broken, although they have a habit of wanting to dissect what catches their attention.

A jewel person who works as secretary for Master Kongo. Euclase's partner.

A jewel person in charge of designing and fixing the outfits of the other jewels, changing their hairstyle frequently.

Crystal twinning."84" and "33".
Twin jewels that are always together and act in synchrony while talking and fighting. They also excel in sword fighting.

A jewel person who is incapable of saying "no" to people who ask for their help.

A young jewel person with a sharp tongue. Benitoite's partner.

The second youngest jewel person after Phos, and Yellow Diamond's partner.

A jewel person in charge of manufacturing the tools, weapons and daily items for the other jewels.

The oldest of the jewel people, and the fastest. Zircon's partner. They were once partnered with a Green Diamond. 

One of the oldest gems, they're wise and kind. Jade's partner.

A jewel person with an obsession with understanding the Lunarians, although they have a tendency to turn berserk when they see one. As such, Master Kongo has forbidden them from fighting. 

Papermaker, obsessed with their job.

A jewel who only appears during the winter, when the other jewels undergo hibernation. They have become much sturdier thanks to the cold.

 Artisan, a sweet and calm jewel person. Peridot's partner.

 Energetic younger jewel person.

 Known as Hemimor, a fighter and Watermelon Tourmaline's partner.

A golden-colored jewel person, taken by the Lunarians prior the beginning of the story.

Rutile's partner. A jewel person nearly as old and strong as the diamonds, who was born incomplete, hence spending most of their time asleep.

A powerful monk who oversees the jewel people and acts as a teacher, and parental figure, to them. He is much sturdier than the jewels and when meditating or sleeping, he scarcely wakes up. His outer shell is composed of hexagonal diamond (lonsdaleite). He is later revealed to have a connection to the Lunarians, a mysterious race of humanoid beings who inhabit the Moon, and frequently come down to Earth to capture the jewel people.

Admirabilis

She is the king of the admirabilis.

He is the younger brother of Ventricosus.

Lunarians

The leader of the Lunarians. Though his people call him the "prince", it's an honorific title. He is revealed to have connections with Kongo, as he and his people rely on him in order to allow them to pass on. He goes as far as capturing the Gems and grinding them to dust in order to get Kongo's attention from Earth.

A soft and kind-hearted Lunarian who assists Phos while on their stay on the Moon.

Media

Manga
Land of the Lustrous is written and illustrated by Haruko Ichikawa. The manga began serialization in Kodansha's Monthly Afternoon magazine on October 25, 2012. In December 2020, it was announced that the manga would enter on hiatus. The series resumed publication on June 24, 2022. Kodansha has collected its chapters into individual tankōbon volumes. The first volume was released on July 23, 2013, with a promotional video by Studio Hibari released on the same day. As of November 22, 2022, twelve volumes have been released.

Kodansha Comics announced during their 2016 New York Comic-Con panel that they have licensed the manga in North America in English. The first volume was released on June 27, 2017.

Volume list

Anime

An anime television series adaptation aired in Japan between October 7 and December 23, 2017. Takahiko Kyōgoku directed the series at the Orange CG animation studio. Toshiya Ono wrote series scripts and Yōichi Nishikawa created the concept art. Asako Nishida designed the characters. Sentai Filmworks have licensed the series and streamed the anime on Anime Strike. MVM Films has licensed the series in the UK. The series ran for 12 episodes, which was released across six DVD and Blu-ray sets in Japan.

Reception
Land of the Lustrous was number 10 on the Takarajimasha's Kono Manga ga Sugoi! list of top 20 Manga for Male Readers survey in 2014. It was number 48 on the 15th Book of the Year list by Da Vinci magazine in 2014. and 46 on the 20th edition in 2020. It was nominated for the eighth Manga Taishō award in 2015. The series ranked 19th in the first Next Manga Award in the print manga category.

As of October 2017, the manga had 1.4 million copies in circulation. Volume 1 reached the 47th place on the weekly Oricon manga chart and, as of July 27, 2013, has sold 21,204 copies; volume 2 reached the 35th place and, as of February 2, 2014, has sold 44,511 copies; volume 3 reached the 30th place and, as of August 31, 2014, has sold 56,765 copies.

References

External links
  
 

2012 manga
Action anime and manga
Fantasy anime and manga
Post-apocalyptic anime and manga
Gemstones in fiction
Kodansha manga
Seinen manga